Staroivanovka is a rural locality (a selo) and the administrative center of Staroivanovsky Rural Settlement, Volokonovsky District, Belgorod Oblast, Russia. The population was 1,117 as of 2010. There are 6 streets.

Geography 
Staroivanovka is located 11 km north of Volokonovka (the district's administrative centre) by road. Novorozhdestvenka is the nearest rural locality.

References 

Rural localities in Volokonovsky District